Waterfall is an unincorporated community in Fulton County, Pennsylvania, United States. Waterfall has a post office, with ZIP code 16689.

References

Unincorporated communities in Fulton County, Pennsylvania
Unincorporated communities in Pennsylvania